Quedjau Frantsiskovych Nhabali (born 8 July 1990) is a Ukrainian judoka. He competed at the 2016 Summer Olympics in Rio de Janeiro, in the men's 90 kg.

References

External links
 
 
 

1990 births
Living people
Ukrainian male judoka
Olympic judoka of Ukraine
Judoka at the 2016 Summer Olympics
Sportspeople from Kyiv
Universiade medalists in judo
Universiade bronze medalists for Ukraine
Judoka at the 2015 European Games
Judoka at the 2019 European Games
European Games medalists in judo
European Games bronze medalists for Ukraine
Medalists at the 2011 Summer Universiade
Ukrainian people of Bissau-Guinean descent
Judoka at the 2020 Summer Olympics